Coleotechnites is a genus of moths in the family Gelechiidae described by Vactor Tousey Chambers in 1880. One of the best known species is the lodgepole needle miner (C. milleri), a serious pest of forest trees in North America.

Species
Coleotechnites albicostata (Freeman, 1965) (Eucordylea)
Coleotechnites alnifructella (Busck, 1915) (Recurvaria)
Coleotechnites apicitripunctella (Clemens, 1860) (Recurvaria)
Coleotechnites ardas (Freeman, 1960) (Evagora)
Coleotechnites argentiabella (Chambers, 1874) (Gelechia)
Coleotechnites atrupictella (Dietz, 1900) (Eucordylea)
Coleotechnites australis (Freeman, 1963) (Pulicalvaria)
Coleotechnites bacchariella (Keifer, 1927) (Recurvaria)
Coleotechnites biopes (Freeman, 1960) (Evagora)
Coleotechnites blastovora (McLeod, 1962) (Eucordylea)
Coleotechnites canusella (Freeman, 1957) (Recurvaria)
Coleotechnites carbonaria (Freeman, 1965) (Pulicalvaria)
Coleotechnites chillcotti (Freeman, 1963) (Exoteleia)
Coleotechnites citriella (Chambers, 1880) (Recurvaria)
Coleotechnites colubrinae (Busck, 1903) (Recurvaria)
Coleotechnites condignella (Busck, 1929) (Recurvaria)
Coleotechnites coniferella (Kearfott, 1907) (Recurvaria)
Coleotechnites cristatella (Chambers, 1875) (Gelechia)
Coleotechnites ducharmei (Freeman, 1962) (Eucordylea)
Coleotechnites edulicola Hodges & Stevens, 1978
Coleotechnites elucidella (Barnes & Busck, 1920) (Eucordylea)
Coleotechnites eryngiella (Bottimer, 1926) (Recurvaria)
Coleotechnites florae (Freeman, 1960) (Evagora)
Coleotechnites gallicola (Busck, 1915) (Recurvaria)
Coleotechnites gibsonella (Kearfott, 1907) (Recurvaria)
Coleotechnites granti (Freeman, 1965) (Publicalvaria)
Coleotechnites huntella (Keifer, 1936) (Eucordylea)
Coleotechnites invictella (Busck, 1908) (Recurvaria)
Coleotechnites juniperella (Kearfott, 1903) (Recurvaria)
Coleotechnites laricis (Freeman, 1965) (Pulicalvaria)
Coleotechnites lewisi (Freeman, 1960) (Evagora)
Coleotechnites mackiei (Keifer, 1932) (Eucordylea)
Coleotechnites macleodi (Freeman, 1965) (Pulicalvaira)
Coleotechnites martini (Freeman, 1965) (Pulicalvaria)
Coleotechnites milleri (Busck, 1914) (Recurvaria)
Coleotechnites moreonella (Heinr., 1920) (Recurvaria)
Coleotechnites nigritus Hodges, 1983
Coleotechnites obliquistrigella (Chambers, 1872) (Anarsia)
Coleotechnites occidentis (Freeman, 1965) (Pulicalvaria)
Coleotechnites petulans (Meyrick, 1917) (Hapalosaris)
Coleotechnites piceaella (Kearfott, 1903) (Recurvaria)
Coleotechnites pinella (Busck, 1906) (Recurvaria)
Coleotechnites ponderosae Hodges & Stevens, 1978
Coleotechnites quercivorella (Chambers, 1872) (Gelechia)
Coleotechnites resinosae (Freeman, 1960) (Evagora)
Coleotechnites stanfordia (Keifer, 1933) (Recurvaria)
Coleotechnites starki (Freeman, 1957) (Recurvaria)
Coleotechnites thujaella (Kearfott, 1903) (Recurvaria)
Coleotechnites vagatioella (Chambers, 1873) (Eidothoa)
Coleotechnites variiella (Chambers, 1872) (Gelechia)

Former species
Coleotechnites abietisella (Packard, 1883) (Gelechia)
Coleotechnites attritella (Walker, 1864) (Gelechia)
Coleotechnites dorsivittella (Zeller, 1873) (Gelechia)
Coleotechnites gilviscopella (Zeller, 1873) (Gelechia)
Coleotechnites niger (Busck, 1903) (Recurvaria)
Coleotechnites obscurella (Kearfott, 1907) (Recurvaria)

External links
ForestPests Profile: C. milleri
Revision of Holarctic Teleiodini (Lepidoptera: Gelechiidae)

 
Litini
Moth genera